The 2012 Durand Cup was the 125th season of the Durand Cup, the third oldest football tournament in the world, which is a knock-out competition held in India. Churchill Brothers were the current holders, having beaten Prayag United in the 2011 Final.

The tournament was held from 16 August to 1 September with all matches at the Ambedkar Stadium in New Delhi.

Air India won the 2012 Durand Cup in the final after beating Dodsal 3–2 on penalties after the match ended 0–0 after 120 minutes.

Preliminary round

Round 1

Round 2

Quarter-finals

The quarter-finals of the Durand Cup shall be played between 12 teams. Five of the teams currently play in 2012–13 I-League, two played in the 2012 I-League 2nd Division and one currently play in the Mumbai Football League. The other four spots would have been taken up by the top three teams from the preliminary round plus one service team. However, on 22 August 2012 it was announced that HAL SC would withdraw from the tournament (along with Churchill Brothers S.C. who withdrew before the initial list of teams was released) and thus freeing an extra space. So in order to fill it up the Durand Football Committee decided to qualify the four teams remaining in the preliminary rounds. Therefore, Delhi United FC, FC Punjab Police, Assam Rifles FC, and CRPF FC will qualify directly for the quarter-finals.

Group A

Group B

Group C

Group D

Semi-finals

Final

Scorers
All goals from tournament proper. Goals from qualifiers are not counted in this list.

3 goals
  M. Kamei (Assam Rifles)

2 goals
  Michael Okwudiu (Delhi United)
  Mohammed Rafi (Dodsal)
  Thoi Singh (Dodsal)
  Pappachen Pradeep (Dodsal)
  Sunil Kumar (Dodsal)
  Ogba Kalu Nnanna (Sporting Goa)
  Pradeep Mohanraj (Air India)
  Chukwudi Chukwuma (SESA Football Academy)

1 goal
  Jeje Lalpekhlua (Pune)
  Holicharan Narzary (Pailan Arrows)
  Milan Singh (Pailan Arrows)
  Avinabo Bag (Pailan Arrows)
  Souvik Chakraborty (Air India)
  Bong Bertrand (Sporting Goa)
  Victorino Fernandes (Sporting Goa)
  Pratesh Shirodkar (Sporting Goa)
  Kailash Patil (ONGC)
  Yogesh Kadam (SESA Football Academy)
  Inacio Colaco (SESA Football Academy)
  Don Bosco Andrew (SESA Football Academy)
  Sunny Singh (SESA Football Academy)
  P. Soumerjit (Central Reserve Police)
  Sugesh (Central Reserve Police)
  Herojit Singh (Army Red)
  Demba Diakhaté (Dodsal)
  Nawab Zeeshan (Dodsal)
  Ong Lepcha (Air India)
  Neil Gaikwad (Air India)
  Gagandeep Singh (Air India)
  Bulu Jidung (Assam Rifles)
  Ajit Kumar Singh (Assam Rifles)

References

 
2012–13 in Indian football
2012 domestic association football cups
2012